Dogs of Peace are an American Christian rock band from Nashville, Tennessee, and they started making music together in 1995. They have released two studio albums, Speak (1996) and Heel (2016).

Background
The band are session musicians from Nashville, Tennessee, where they formed in 1995 with vocalist and guitarist, Gordon Kennedy of White Heart, vocalist and bassist, Jimmie Lee Sloas of The Imperials, background vocalist and keyboardist, Blair Masters, drummer and percussionist, John Hammond, and music engineer and music producer, Jeff Balding.

Music history
Their first studio album, Speak, was released on February 22, 1996, by Sparrow Records. The second studio album, Heel, was released by Suite 28 Records, on April 22, 2016. Kennedy talked to New Release Today about the song "He's the Light of the World".

Members
 Gordon Kennedy – vocals, guitar
 Jimmie Lee Sloas – vocals, bass
 Blair Masters – keys, background vocals
 John Hammond – drums, percussion
 Jeff Balding – engineer, producer

Discography
Studio albums
 Speak (February 22, 1996, Sparrow)
 Heel (April 22, 2016, Suite 28)

References

External links

CMnexus profile

Christian rock groups from Tennessee
Musical groups established in 1995
Musical groups from Nashville, Tennessee
1995 establishments in Tennessee
Sparrow Records artists